This is a timeline of UK television coverage of the four major sports in the USA - the NFL, NBA, NHL and Major League Baseball.

1980s 
 1982 
 7 November – Coverage of American sport gets its first regular coverage on UK television when Channel 4 starts broadcasting American football on a weekly basis.

 1983 
 30 January –  Live American Football is seen in the UK for the first time when Channel 4 broadcasts live coverage of Super Bowl XVII.

 1984  
 29 March – Screensport launches and coverage of American sport is a significant part of its output throughout its time on air.

 1985
 No events.

 1986
 No events.

 1987
 29 August – As part of its newly launched overnight schedule, London Weekend Television shows weekly highlights of American sport, including Major League Baseball, IndyCar racing and college football. The coverage is also broadcast on Anglia Television due to Anglia simulcasting LWT's overnight schedule. The coverage ends approximately a year later.

 1988
 ESPN increases its stake in Screensport from 3.5% to 25.5% after purchasing shares from WHSmith for £4.4 million and by 1988 American sport was a significant part of the channel's schedule as in this year it was broadcasting regular coverage of the NHL, NBA and Major League Baseball.1989 No events.

 1990s 
 1990 No events.

 1991 No events.

 1992 No events.

 1993 Following the demise of Screensport in March 1993, Sky Sports takes over as the UK's broadcaster of Major League Baseball.

 1994 No events.

 1995 Sky Sports broadcasts the NFL for the first time.

 1996 26 October – Sky's coverage of Major League Baseball ends.

 1997 31 March – On its first night on air, Channel 5 launches its overnight weekday live and recorded coverage of American sports. The first programme features the opening day of the 1997 Major League Baseball season.

 1998 25 January – Channel 4 ends its coverage of American Football when it shows Super Bowl XXXII. This ends a relationship with the sport that had existed since its first week on air. The rights move to Channel 5  and remain with Channel 5 until 2004.
 March – MLB on Five launches when Channel 5 decides to create a specific programme for its coverage of Major League Baseball.

 1999 No events.

 2000s 
 2000 No events.

 2001 No events.

 2002 5 December – NASN launches to show live and recorded coverage of North American sports.

 2003 No events.

 2004 June – Channel 5's regular coverage of the National Hockey League ends for two years when the primary broadcast rights move to NASN.2005 January – ITV broadcasts American Football for the first time when it shows the play-offs and the Superbowl. ITV also broadcasts these events in 2006 and 2007 until the rights move to the BBC in 2008.

 2006 13 March – NASN buys the rights to show ten live Major League Baseball games a week.
 September – Channel 5 resumes its coverage of the National Hockey League.

 2007 March – ESPN buys NASN and the purchase sees the return of ESPN's flagship magazine shows, such as Baseball Tonight, Around the Horn, The Sports Reporters and Pardon the Interruption, which had not been shown since the previous year after the contract between NASN and ESPN ended.
 September – 
 The BBC shows coverage of the NFL for the first time.
 Channel 5 returns to NFL coverage when it signs a two-year deal to broadcast Monday Night Football and NBC Sunday Night Football.

 2008 29 October – MLB on Five is broadcast for the final time to coincide with Channel 5 deciding to end its coverage of Major League Baseball due to the Global recession of 2008-09.

 2009 1 February – NASN is renamed ESPN America following the sale in late 2006 of the channel to ESPN.
 12 June – Channel 5's coverage of the NHL finishes. It also ends its coverage of the NBA at the same time.

2010s2010 1 March – A European edition of SportsCenter starts to be broadcast five nights a week on ESPN America.
 Channel 5 ends its live overnight coverage of American sport, when it decides not to continue its coverage of American Football. This brings to an end its coverage of American sport which had been a mainstay of Channel 5's weeknight overnight programming since the channel's launch.
 21 June – ESPN America begins broadcasting in high definition.
 September – American Football returns to Channel 4 after more than a decade when the channel starts broadcasting the Sunday Night Football match.
 14 September – ESPN UK starts broadcasting live coverage of all of the National Football League's Monday night matches as well as the 90-minute pre-game programme, Monday Night Countdown.2011 12 October – Premier Sports announces that they will broadcast up to 10 live National Hockey League games per week from the 2011–12 season. The rights had previously been held by ESPN America although the channel does broadcast some matches for the remainder of that season.2012 April – ESPN America stops broadcasting a European version of SportsCentre, instead opting to broadcast an edited version of the 2am show produced in Los Angeles.
 5 July – Premier Sports announces that NHL will continue for a further 4 years on the channel with appropriately 400 games per season being broadcast and complemented by a daily broadcast of Hockey Tonight. Premier later further extends its coverage of NHL which now runs until 2021.
 September – The BBC broadcasts Monday Night Football but does so for just one season as for the 2013/14 season, terrestrial coverage of the NFL moves to Channel 4.2013 8 September – Channel 4's American Football coverage expands when it signs a new two-year deal with the NFL to become the terrestrial home to the game for the nest two seasons. The deal sees the return of the Superbowl to Channel 4, 16 years after it had last shown the event. 
 9 September – Eurosport becomes the new broadcast of the NFL's Monday Night Football. Eurosport broadcasts the weekly game for the next two seasons.
 1 December – BT Sport shows its first NBA match, thereby adding professional basketball to its broadcasting of the college game which it shows as part of its coverage of the NCAA.2014 No events.2015 Sky Sports secures live coverage of NBC's Sunday Night Football coverage and ESPN's Monday Night Football, giving Sky live rights to every NFL game during the season for the first time. 
 9 September – The BBC announces that the NFL will return to its screens after two seasons on Channel 4. The deal includes the rights to show the NFL London Games live with at least one match being exclusively live. The BBC also show weekly highlights and magazine shows, which starts in November. The deal included live television, radio and online rights to screen the Super Bowl alongside Sky Sports.2016 No events.2017 No events.2018 June – BT Sport shows the NBA for the final time ahead of the rights transferring to Sky Sports.
 October – Basketball's NBA returns to Sky Sports after a decade with ESPN and BT Sport.2019 No events.

2020s
 2020 3 September – Sky Sports NFL launches. It is an in-season rebrand of Sky Sports Action and provides round-the clock coverage of the NFL. As well as live and recorded coverage of games, output includes simulcasts of magazine shows from NFL Network such as Good Morning Football and NFL Total Access. The channel broadcasts until early February 2021. Sky Sports NFL returns for the following season, running from 23 August 2021 until February 2022.
 14 September – Channel 5 resumes its coverage of the NFL when it starts showing the weekly Monday night game plus a weekly highlights show.

 2021 No events.

 2022'''
 9 September – After seven years on the BBC, terrestrial coverage of the NFL returns to ITV. The deal includes the rights to show two of the three NFL London Games and the Super Bowl in addition to a weekly highlights programme.

References

American sport on UK television
American sport on UK television
American sport on UK television
Sports television in the United Kingdom
American sport on UK television